Thurrock is a unitary authority area with borough status and unparished area in the ceremonial county of Essex, England. It is part of the London commuter belt and an area of regeneration within the Thames Gateway redevelopment zone. The local authority is Thurrock Council.

The borough
It lies on the River Thames just to the east of London. With Greater London to the west and the river to the south, the county of Essex abuts the Borough to the north and east, and across the river lies Kent.

Politics
The local authority is Thurrock Council. Elections are held 3 out of every 5 years. In 2021, the Conservative Party took overall control of the council, having been a minority-party administration since 2016.

Thurrock is covered by two parliamentary constituencies. Thurrock includes most of the borough while South Basildon and East Thurrock includes some wards in the east of the borough. Both seats were Conservative gains from Labour at the 2010 general election.

The council has been led by Cllr Rob Gledhill (C) since May 2016. Serving since 2021, the Mayor of Thurrock is Councillor Sue Shinnick. In late-2022, the Tory administration had to admit that its  disastrous investments since 2016 caused a £500m deficit.

Land use
Thurrock has a population of 175,500  people living in 90,500 homes. The Metropolitan Green Belt covers 70% of the borough. There are seven conservation areas, 19 scheduled monuments, including the dovecote at High House Purfleet, and 239 listed buildings.

The borough contains ten Sites of Special Scientific Interest: 
Globe Pit, Grays
Grays Chalk Pit
Lion Pit, Grays
Purfleet Chalk Pits
West Thurrock Lagoon and Marshes
Inner Thames Marshes
Vange and Fobbing Marshes
Basildon Meadows
Mucking Flats and Marshes
Hangman's Wood and Deneholes

Despite much of the borough being protected Green Belt land, Thurrock provides localised opportunities for further industrial and commercial development. The borough forms part of the Thames Gateway regeneration area, a corridor of opportunity that has been identified by central government as the area with greatest development and commercial potential in the country. Thurrock Development Corporation took over much of the borough's planning functions from its creation in 2005 until its demise in March 2011.

Much of the population and commercial activity is centred along the riverfront. This includes many large and important industrial sites, including two large oil refineries, manufacturing industries, a container port, cruise liner terminal, distribution warehousing and one of Britain's largest refuse disposal sites at the appropriately named settlement of Mucking. Thurrock is also home to the Lakeside Shopping Centre.

Attractions

There is one multiplex cinema attached to the Lakeside Shopping Centre, and the Thameside Theatre in Grays. Live shows are held at the Circus Tavern in Purfleet. Open space includes Chafford Gorges Nature Park, Langdon Hills Country Park and Grove House Wood, managed by Essex Wildlife Trust. Museums and historic buildings include Coalhouse Fort at East Tilbury, Tilbury Fort in Tilbury, Purfleet Heritage and Military Centre, High House, Purfleet with its historic farm buildings, the Royal Opera House's Bob and Tamar Manoukian Production Workshop, The Backstage Centre and ACME artists' studios, Thurrock Museum and Walton Hall Farm Museum.

Next to Lakeside Shopping Centre is Arena Essex, a former motor sports complex, where speedway, banger and stock car racing took place. This site is now to be redeveloped for housing.

History
Mammoths once grazed in the Thurrock area and archaeologists unearthed the remains of a jungle cat. Humans have lived in the area since prehistoric times and the land has been farmed by the Romans and Anglo-Saxons. Thurrock has numerous archaeological sites including the major excavation at Mucking. The name "Thurrock" is a Saxon name meaning "the bottom of a ship".

 Horndon-on-the-Hill was the site of an 11th century mint as well as the 15th century woolmarket which gives an indication of the area's wealth in the 15th century. The narrowing of the river where Tilbury now stands meant it was important in the defence of London, and Henry VIII built three blockhouses, two on the Tilbury side and another on the Gravesend side of the river, following the end of his marriage to Catherine of Aragon.

Lodge Lane in the Grays district of Thurrock holds important Historical Significance as being the Ancient site of the Coronation of Anglo Saxon King Sæberht, Saberht or Sæbert son of Barton(r. c. 604 – c. 616). The exact site can not be confirmed but it is believed to be between Connaught Avenue and Victoria Avenue on the North Side of Lodge Lane. Such is the significance of this site, Township can still legally be represented as East Windsor due to its association with the current British royal family.

In 1381, villagers from Fobbing, Mucking and Stanford-le-Hope instigated the Peasants' Revolt when they were called to Brentwood to pay the poll tax. When they refused to pay, a riot ensued which was the catalyst for a mass protest across Essex and Kent.

Later, in 1588 Elizabeth I addressed her troops not far from the Tilbury blockhouse as the Spanish Armada sailed up the English Channel. Between 1670 and 1682, the Tilbury blockhouse was substantially rebuilt into a much larger fortification (Tilbury Fort) and Coalhouse Fort was built further down river, close to the second blockhouse. The importance of the forts in defending the country continued through Napoleonic times and into the two world wars. The land where Tilbury Town now stands was farmland and marsh grazing until the building of the docks in the 1890s. Thurrock includes the Bata village, built for workers of the shoe company in 1933. Eight homes and the factory are listed.
 
Historically, the area was renowned for mineral extraction, including clay, aggregates and notably the digging of huge amounts of chalk from the West Thurrock area for use in the now defunct cement industries. When chalk extraction ceased one of the disused pits was redeveloped as Lakeside Shopping Centre. A number of former pits have been used to form the Chafford Gorges Nature Reserve, managed by the Essex Wildlife Trust.

The parish of Thurrock was formed on 1 April 1936 from Aveley, Bulphan, Chadwell St Mary, Corringham, East Tilbury, Fobbing, Grays Thurrock, Horndon on the Hill, Langdon Hills, Little Thurrock, Mucking, North Ockendon, Orsett, South Ockendon, Stanford le Hope, Stifford, West Thurrock and West Tilbury, on 1 April 1938 part of Little Burstead was transferred to Thurrock. The present-day borough of Thurrock was created in on 1 April 1974 from the former area of Thurrock Urban District and Thurrock parish which was abolished and the area became an unparished area. The Local Government Act 1972 left the boundaries mostly untouched, although part of it, in Basildon New Town, was ceded to the Basildon district and the district gained borough status.

It was given administrative independence from Essex County Council on 1 April 1998 by The Essex (Boroughs of Colchester, Southend-on-Sea and Thurrock and District of Tendring) (Structural, Boundary and Electoral Changes) Order 1996although there is strong support within the area for this status to be removed. It remains part of Essex for ceremonial purposes such as lord-lieutenancy.

Captain Kidd
The body of Captain Kidd was displayed in Thurrock. He had been convicted of piracy and hanged on 23 May 1701, at 'Execution Dock', Wapping. His body was gibbeted — left to hang in an iron cage over the Thames at Tilbury Point — as a warning to future would-be pirates for twenty years. Some sources give the location where his body was exhibited as Tilbury Ness, but this may be an alternative name for the same place. There is some uncertainty as to whether his body was displayed at what is now called Coalhouse Point or at a site a few hundred yards up stream, close to the present Tilbury Docks.

1953 Floods
On 31 January 1953, the low-lying areas of Thurrock were inundated by the North Sea flood of 1953. The Van den Berghs and Jurgens margarine factory, which manufactured Stork margarine, was forced to stop production for many months. Since the output of this factory constituted one third of the country's ration allocation, this led to a severe strain on the supply of margarine in the UK. Most schools in Thurrock were closed, either as a direct result of the flooding or in order to use them to help the relief effort. More than 1300 people in Tilbury and other low-lying areas were evacuated to schools on the higher ground. Chadwell St Mary Primary school was used as the main welfare centre for the homeless. By 15 February, most schools had returned to normal. The last to resume were the Landsdowne school in Tilbury and the newly opened Woodside Primary School – then called Tyrell Heath School. On Friday 13 February, the flooded areas were visited by the young Queen Elizabeth II Despite severe loss of life in nearby Canvey Island, only one person in Thurrock died as a result of the floods.

Heritage plaques
In 2002, a partnership between Thurrock Council, Thurrock Heritage Forum and the Thurrock Local History Society began an initiative to place heritage plaques marking the famous people, events and organisations associated with Thurrock. By September 2021 plaques included:
Joseph Conrad
Alice Mangold Diehl (Musician and Novelist, born in Aveley) 
Dracula's connection to Purfleet
The arrival of the Empire Windrush at Tilbury on 21 June 1948
The training ship Exmouth
The Kynoch factory in the Corringham marshes
The shooting down of Zeppelin L15 at Purfleet in 1916
Philip Vincent
Alfred Russel Wallace and his house at the Dell
Arthur Young
The establishment of the town of Tilbury in 1912
John Newton's connection with Aveley and Purfleet
Benjamin Franklin's connection with the design of a lightning conductor for the Purfleet gunpowder magazine
Henry de Grey, who gave his name to Grays
Kate Luard, the much decorated Boer War and First World War nurse

Culture and film
Thurrock has been the scene of several major films. St Clement's Church and street scenes at West Thurrock were used in the making of the film Four Weddings and a Funeral. Thurrock can also be seen in 28 Days Later. Scenes from the films Alfie (2004), and Indiana Jones and the Last Crusade were shot at Tilbury docks. The opening scenes from Batman Begins (2005) were shot at Coalhouse Fort in East Tilbury. Some filming also took place for the film Essex Boys in and around the Bata estate at East Tilbury. The State Cinema, where Eddie met Roger in the classic Who Framed Roger Rabbit, can be found in Grays.

Art Deco architecture in Thurrock
 There are a number of examples of Art Deco architecture in Thurrock. The baggage hall at Tilbury was opened in 1930. It has an art deco interior, designed by Sir Edwin Cooper and is a grade II listed building. The State cinema is also a listed building and dates from 1938. It is one of the few surviving examples of 1930s cinema architecture. It has the original cinema organ which can still be played. However, in the early 21st century the building became disused and faced dereliction. In September 2015 it was announced that J D Wetherspoon had bought the property for conversion to a public house.( Building of the Bata Shoes estate in East Tilbury was begun in 1933, and this is now a conservation area.JD Wetherspoon have since put the State Cinema building up for sale after announcing they would no longer be converting it to a public house January 2023

Chadwell St Mary has one of the few examples of a "Sunspan" house designed by the architect Wells Coates. Although built in the 1950s, Woodside Primary School's architecture has been described as the slightly earlier "ocean liner" style of Art Deco. The building features a number of bricked curves and circular windows, while the wrought-iron banisters on the stairs are deliberately set to lean out at an angle.

Demographics

At the census of 2011, there were 157,705 people, 62,353 households and 45,985 families residing in the borough. The population density was 9.7 people per hectare. There were 63,869 housing units. The racial makeup of the borough was 86% White, 3.8% Asian, 7.8% Black, 2% Mixed Race, 0.6% other.

There were 62,353 households, out of which 30.5% had children under the age of 18 living with them, 72.7% were married couples living together, 52.5% of all households were made up of individuals, 10.2% had someone living alone who was 65 years of age or older.

The median age in the borough was 42. 25.5% of residents were under the age of 18; 7.3% of residents were between the ages of 19 and 24; 30.3% were from 25 to 44; 24.2% were from 45 to 64; and 38.2% were 65 years of age or older. The gender makeup of the city was 49.3% male and 50.6% female.

Education

Thurrock has 55 schools; 39 of them are primary schools, 13 are secondary, two are special and one is alternative. All but one have free school or academy status, with Grays Convent High School instead having voluntary aided status. Five schools, including Grays Convent High School and four primary schools, are Catholic faith schools while two primary schools are Anglican faith schools. 44 schools in Thurrock are operated by one of 13 multi-academy trusts, which include major chains such as the Harris Federation and Ormiston Trust and the country's first cooperative academy trust. Since 2007, all secondary schools in Thurrock have had specialist school status. Some schools, such as William Edwards School and Orsett Heath Academy, utilise their right as specialist schools to select 10% of their pupils in specialist subject aptitude every year.

Thurrock has no grammar schools, although Thurrock Council has tried to introduce them. Historically Thurrock had three grammar schools, Grays Thurrock School, Palmer's School for Boys and Palmer's School for Girls. In 1931, the Palmer's schools became public schools with boarding, reverting back to grammar school status in 1944 under voluntary control. Grays Convent High School was an independent day school from its formation until 1969. There were also two selective secondary technical schools, Grays County Technical High School which is now an academy status comprehensive and Aveley County Technical High School, which merged with the Palmer's schools in 1971 to form Palmer's College.

Palmer's College, now one half of USP College, is Thurrock's local sixth form college for generalised further education, whilst the Thurrock Campus of South Essex College is the local sixth form college for vocational education. Palmer's also offers courses at higher education. Other institutions of further education in Thurrock include the Thurrock Adult Community College, Osborne Sixth Form and Ortu Sixth Form Centre Stanford & Corringham.

Partnerships
The Tilbury and Chadwell St Mary Excellence Cluster brought together Chadwell St Mary Primary School, ORTU Corringham Primary School, Grays Convent High School, Hassenbrook Academy, Herringham Primary School, Landsdowne Primary School, Manor Infant School, Manor Junior School, St Mary's RC Primary School, Woodside Primary School and The Gateway Academy. Senior members of the schools' councils also sat on the cluster's student council before its dissolution.

ORTU Gable Hall School has had a long partnership with Pro Arte Alphen Park School in Pretoria, Gauteng, South Africa for almost 10 years – the two schools have held exchange programmes with each other and the students sampling life in each other's respective countries.

Woodside Primary is linked with a school in Nepal, through the charity Gorkha Learning for Life, which was founded by a member of school staff.

Transport

Being on the river and close to London, Thurrock is served with good communication links. The M25 London Orbital Motorway, the railway line between Southend and London Fenchurch Street which provides direct access to Central London, the Port of Tilbury, and the nearby London City Airport make Thurrock an important international trade centre. There is a grass airstrip south of Bulphan village. A ferry for passengers on foot connects Tilbury with Gravesend on the southern bank of the River Thames.

Rail transport in the borough is provided by c2c with stations at:

Chafford Hundred railway station
East Tilbury railway station
Grays railway station
Ockendon railway station
Purfleet railway station
Stanford-le-Hope railway station
Tilbury Town railway station
West Horndon railway station (on northern boundary)

Bus services within the Thurrock urban area are mostly provided by Ensignbus.

Arriva has a depot at West Thurrock, but all of its work is Transport for London contracts and has only one route running into Thurrock, the 370.

Other operators are First Essex, Stagecoach London and NIBS Buses.

Economy
This is a chart of trend of regional gross value added of Thurrock at current basic prices published (pp. 240–253) by Office for National Statistics with figures in millions of British Pounds Sterling.

Sport and leisure
Thurrock has several Non-League football clubs in the area:
Tilbury F.C. the oldest surviving football club in Thurrock having been formed in 1889. They have played at Chadfields since 1947.
Thurrock F.C. which played at Ship Lane and was dissolved in 2018
Aveley F.C. which plays at Parkside
Grays Athletic F.C. which played in at the New Recreation Ground in central Grays until 2010, but now plays at Parkside
East Thurrock United F.C. which plays at Rookery Hill

Thurrock Yacht Club is based in the centre of Grays on the Thames foreshore. It offers a range of competitive and recreational boating opportunities.

List of places in the borough
Aveley
Bulphan
Chadwell St Mary
Chafford Hundred
Corringham
Coryton Refinery
East Tilbury
Fobbing
Grays
Horndon-on-the-Hill
Linford
Little Thurrock
Mucking
Orsett
Purfleet-on-Thames
Shell Haven
South Ockendon
Stanford-le-Hope
Stifford
Thames Haven
Thurrock Village
Tilbury
West Thurrock

Historic buildings
Coalhouse Fort
St Clement's Church
The State Cinema
Tilbury Fort
The Woolmarket, Horndon
Palmer's College
Orsett Hall

Climate
Climate in this area has mild differences between highs and lows, and there is adequate rainfall year-round. The Köppen Climate Classification subtype for this climate is "Cfb" (Marine West Coast Climate/Oceanic climate).

Freedom of the Borough
The following people and military units have received the Freedom of the Borough of Thurrock.

Individuals
 Mrs. Dorothy Coker: 26 September 2001.
 Reverend John Guest: 30 September 2021.
 Canon Brian O’Shea: 30 September 2021.
 Father Paul Dynan: 30 September 2021.

Military Units
 215 (Essex) Squadron, RLC: 28 June 1986.
 The Royal Anglian Regiment: 18 July 1990.
 The Port of Tilbury Police: 25 September 2002.
 The Burma Star Association (Thurrock Branch): 26 November 2008.

References

External links
Thurrock Borough Council
Thurrock Gazette
Thurrock Local History Society

 
Local government in Essex
Unitary authority districts of England
Local authorities adjoining the River Thames
Local government districts of the East of England
Port of London
Unparished areas in Essex
Former civil parishes in Essex
Boroughs in England